The Strawberry Tree is a 2011 experimental film directed by Simone Rapisarda Casanova. The film premiered at the 2011 Locarno Film Festival.

Subject 

A year after Hurricane Ike swept their village away, fishermen from Juan Antonio, Cuba, recall their vanished homes and daily lives. Their memories call forth images that had been shot just a few days before the devastation.
However, the ethnographic documentary film that ensues is neither predictable nor conventional. For the filmmaker-ethnographer has rejected the use of scripts of any kind and has become entangled in a paradoxical dialogue with his subjects. The poor yet educated Cuban fishermen prove to be familiar with ethnography and documentary film techniques and continuously interact with the filmmaker. The traditional fly-on-the-wall paradigm is thus both defeated and rendered obsolete.

Production 

Rapisarda Casanova’s stylistic hallmarks include his elliptical, metacinematic approach to storytelling, his use of non-actors, diegetic off-screen sound, meticulously-composed static single-takes, low camera angles and careful elaboration of natural light and colour. His approach to filmmaking is mostly process-driven, after careful research of the thematic base. The intent behind such stylistic and methodological choices is to create cinematic occasions where people and places may reveal their deepest nature.

Release and critical response 

In 2011, The Strawberry Tree was screened at the Locarno Film Festival and the International Documentary Film Festival Amsterdam. In 2012 it screened at the Los Angeles Film Festival and the Miami Film Festival, and it received the Most Promising Filmmaker Award at the Ann Arbor Film Festival. The film ranked 33rd in Film Comments list of the "50 Best Undistributed Films of 2012".

Awards 

 Most Promising Filmmaker award, Ann Arbor Film Festival, MI, USA
 NFB Award for Most Innovative Canadian Documentary, DOXA Documentary Film Festival, Vancouver, Canada
 Best Documentary award, Cine Las Americas International Film Festival, Austin, TX, USA
 Grand Jury Honorable Mention, Miami International Film Festival, FL, USA

Collections 

 Bibliothèque nationale de France
 Library and Archives Canada

References

External links 

 Official webpage of The Strawberry Tree at Ibidemfilms.org
 

Films about filmmaking
Self-reflexive films
2011 films
2010s avant-garde and experimental films
2011 documentary films
Italian avant-garde and experimental films
Canadian avant-garde and experimental films
Italian documentary films
Canadian documentary films
Cuban documentary films
Films set in Cuba
Cuban avant-garde and experimental films
Spanish-language Canadian films
2010s Canadian films